Antony Sumich   (born 30 September 1964 in Auckland, New Zealand) is a former international rugby union and cricket player for Croatia, skiing instructor and rugby coach, and is now a Catholic priest of the Priestly Fraternity of Saint Peter.

Background and sport
Sumich was educated at St Peter's College, Auckland and he completed his training as a civil engineer in Auckland in the 1980s. In 1989 he relocated to Europe, intending to live in Croatia, but because of the war there, he went to Austria and worked there for eight winters as a ski instructor, and elsewhere in Europe while coaching rugby. After the war, he became the coach of the Croatian national rugby team . He also played Cricket for Croatia, being a member of the Croatian National Cricket team in 2001.

Developing his faith
When the war had finished and Sumich returned to Croatia he found a "flourishing faith". "They had broken free from communism and the church was free". "Everyone had rosaries in their pockets." Sumich found himself "practising as a Catholic for the first time in my life, as distinct from just going to Sunday Mass. He wanted to know more about the Faith, because I'd just forgotten everything". His mother sent him a Catechism of the Catholic Church, which he "sat down on a beach and read" over one summer. "It all made sense". He started going to frequent Confession and "finding a sense of shame which probably hadn't existed before". At age 34, Sumich set aside a year, praying intensely, including the 15 prayers of St Bridget of Sweden and the Rosary. At this time, he was the coach of the Croatian rugby team. "We would be playing at the Hong Kong Sevens and my rosary [beads] would be in my pocket and I would finger it".  Sumich liked to challenge his players. "I would say to them, 'strong moral life, strong character on the rugby field; weak moral life, and you are the first one to chuck the towel in when the going gets tough' ". Returning to New Zealand, Sumich found local liturgies very different from what he had become used to in Croatia. But, in Auckland, he was introduced to the "awe-inspiring" Tridentine Mass celebrated by Denzil Meuli at Titirangi. Sumich "felt God's call and sought an order using this rite". He was accepted by the Priestly Fraternity of Saint Peter and went to their formation house,  the International Seminary of St. Peter in Wigratzbad-Opfenbach, Bavaria, but he did most of his studies in Denton, Nebraska at Our Lady of Guadalupe Seminary  where he was ordained deacon in  March 2008.

Priesthood

Sumich was ordained a priest on 29 November 2008, at St Michael's Church, Remuera, Auckland, by Basil Meeking, Bishop Emeritus of Christchurch, using the 1962 Roman Missal and Rite of Ordination. He offered his first Mass on the First Sunday of Advent (30 November 2008); he was the first New Zealander to be ordained for the Priestly Fraternity of St Peter. After his priestly ordination he was stationed in Orlu, Nigeria where he had also served following his ordination as a deacon. In 2011, Sumich was the Rector of St. Gregory's Academy, an American Catholic boarding school located in Elmhurst, Pennsylvania. Sumich served as associate pastor for the Latin Mass community at St. Anthony's Parish in Calgary Alberta, Canada. in 2016, he returned to New Zealand to serve the Latin Mass community in West Auckland (Titirangi and Te Atatū).

Notes

External links

 The Priestly Fraternity of St Peter in Nigeria (accessed 29 June 2010)

1964 births
Living people
Catholic Church in New Zealand
Croatian rugby union players
New Zealand cricket coaches
New Zealand expatriate sportspeople in the United States
New Zealand expatriates in Canada
New Zealand expatriates in Nigeria
New Zealand people of Croatian descent
21st-century New Zealand Roman Catholic priests
New Zealand rugby union coaches
New Zealand rugby union players
New Zealand traditionalist Catholics
People from Auckland
People educated at St Peter's College, Auckland
Priestly Fraternity of St. Peter
Traditionalist Catholic priests